Karin Knapp was the defending champion, but chose not to participate.

Polona Hercog won the title, defeating Ganna Poznikhirenko in the final, 6–2, 7–5.

Seeds

Draw

Finals

Top half

Bottom half

References
Main Draw

Internazionali Femminili di Brescia - Singles